Llantwit Major railway station is a railway station serving the small town of Llantwit Major, South Wales. The present station opened on 12 June 2005, when passenger services were restored on the section of line between Barry and Bridgend.

Passenger services are operated by Transport for Wales as part of the Valleys & Cardiff Local Routes network.

Original station
Llantwit Major was one of the five original stations which opened along with the line in 1897. Originally, there were four lines of rails through it. On the line's opening, the village of Llantwit Major lay to the south, separated from the station by fields, but the town has since expanded to the point where the  station is now more or less in the centre. The station had two platforms, each with a loop line, with a substantial red brick station building on the 'down' platform. The other platform had a smaller shelter. The goods yard was also on the 'down' side. This consisted of a loop line with a centrally-placed crossover which enabled access to the brick goods shed on the outer line of the loop. Extra sidings were added in around 1900. The station closed to regular passenger services in 1964 when these facilities were withdrawn along the line. The final passenger working at the old station was on 25 June 1965 when the royal train arrived at the 'down' platform. It conveyed the Queen and the Duke of Edinburgh en route to an engagement at Atlantic College. Later, the Royal Party rejoined the train for the journey to Port Talbot where the Queen was to open the new Afan Lido.

Services
Monday to Saturdays there is an hourly service westbound to Bridgend and an hourly service eastbound to Cardiff Central and Aberdare. Sundays there is a two-hourly service in each direction between Bridgend and Cardiff Central.

References

External links

Railway stations in the Vale of Glamorgan
DfT Category F2 stations
Former Barry Railway stations
Railway stations in Great Britain opened in 1897
Railway stations in Great Britain closed in 1964
Reopened railway stations in Great Britain
Railway stations in Great Britain opened in 2005
Railway stations served by Transport for Wales Rail
Beeching closures in Wales
railway station
1897 establishments in Wales